The Marshall Thundering Herd men's basketball program competes in the National Collegiate Athletic Association's (NCAA) Division I, representing Marshall University in Conference USA. The program has had 28 head coaches since it began play during the 1906–07 men's basketball season. Since April 2014, Dan D'Antoni has served as Marshall's head coach.

Key

Coaches 
Statistics correct as of the end of the 2021–22 NCAA Division I men's basketball season

Notes

References

Marshall

Marshall Thundering Herd basketball coaches